The  is an archaeological site containing the ruins of a Jōmon period settlement located in what is now the Akagi neighborhood of the city of Shibukawa, Gunma Prefecture in the northern Kantō region of Japan. The site was designated a National Historic Site of Japan in 1927.

Overview
The Takizawa site is located on a hill extending east to west of the western foot of Mount Akagi. It attracted attention because of the foundations of three pit dwellings found in 1926, along with prehistoric storage pits and other artifacts such as Jōmon pottery, stone tools and ritual objects such as clay figurines. Further archaeological excavations revealed that the settlement covered an area of 470 meters east-to-west by 170 meters north-to-south, centering on the hill, which had an abundant spring as a water source in its northeast corner.  At present, the remains of 15 houses from the early to late Jōmon period have been identified, together with embankment remains and dwelling sites from the Heian period indicating centuries of continuous occupation. Also of note was the site of a stone quarry, and also of a large-scale stone circle typically found in sites much further to the north, with a diameter of over 30 meters. 

The artifacts excavated are stored and displayed at the Akagi History Museum, about 10 minutes by car from Shikishima Station on the JR East Jōetsu Line. The ruins were backfilled after excavation.

See also
List of Historic Sites of Japan (Gunma)

References

External links
Shibukawa city official site

Jōmon period
History of Gunma Prefecture
Shibukawa, Gunma
Archaeological sites in Japan
Historic Sites of Japan